Bauhinia mombassae is a species of plant in the family Fabaceae. It is found in Kenya and Tanzania. It is threatened by habitat loss.

References

mombassae
Flora of Kenya
Flora of Tanzania
Endangered flora of Africa
Taxonomy articles created by Polbot